Sneyers is a surname. Notable people with the surname include:

 Arthur Sneyers, Belgian sailor
 René Sneyers (1918–1984), Belgian chemist
 Willy Sneyers (born 1950), Belgian equestrian